Chionochloa antarctica (common name - snow tussock) is a species of grass, endemic to the Auckland and Campbell Islands.

Description
It flowers from October to December and fruits from November to March.

Conservation status
In both 2009 and 2012 it was deemed to be "At Risk - Naturally Uncommon" under the New Zealand Threat Classification System, and this New Zealand classification was reaffirmed in 2018 (due to its restricted range).

References

antarctica
Plants described in 1845
Flora of New Zealand